Talpa is a settlement in Taos County, New Mexico, located  south of the town of Taos along New Mexico Highway 518.

History
First named Rio Chiquito for the river running through the area, Talpa was settled during the early-18th century during the time that nearby Ranchos de Taos began to be settled. The settlement is on the old Spanish land grant of Don Cristobal de la Sena.

The name of the town may have been derived from the town of Talpa in Jalisco, Mexico or it may have been named for Señora Talpa Romero, of a prominent Taos family.

Circa 1820, a private chapel was built for the Duran family in Talpa along the Rio Chiquito. Juan Pedro Cruz (born about 1855) was a well-known weaver who supplied sarapes, embroidered bedspreads, and rugs to residents of the Taos Pueblo and local villages. Ponce de Leon Hot Springs, used by Native Americans and early Spanish settlers, are located near Talpa.

Education
It is within Taos Municipal Schools, which operates Taos High School.

Gallery

See also

 High Road to Taos
 Pot Creek Cultural Site, located just south of Talpa

References

Census-designated places in Taos County, New Mexico
Census-designated places in New Mexico
Spanish mission settlements in North America